George Henry Tomlinson Jr. (July 28, 1896 – May 21, 1963) was a Canadian politician. He served in the Legislative Assembly of British Columbia from 1953 to 1956  from the electoral district of North Vancouver, a member of the Social Credit Party.

References

1896 births
1963 deaths
British Columbia Social Credit Party MLAs
British emigrants to Canada